Azeez Adeshina Fashola (born 10 May 1991), known professionally as Naira Marley, is a British-Nigerian singer and song writer. He is known as the president of his controversial fan base, "Marlians".

Education 
At the age of 11, he moved to Peckham, South London, England. Naira Marley graduated with a distinction in business from Peckham Academy. He also studied business law at Crossways College (now Christ the King Sixth Form College).

Career

2014–2018: Career beginnings 
While growing up, Naira Marley had plans of becoming an MC and a voice-over artist. He began singing in 2014 after discovering his passion for music and was encouraged by close-knit friends to pursue his music career. He released the Max Twigz-assisted track "Marry Juana" before releasing his debut EP Gotta Dance in 2015.

In December 2017, he released the Olamide and Lil Kesh-assisted single "Issa Goal", which became the theme song for the Super Eagles at the 2018 FIFA World Cup. The official remix of "Issa Goal" was released on 16 June 2018; it features vocals by Olamide, Lil Kesh, Falz, Simi and Slimcase.

Naira Marley sings in English, Pidgin and Yoruba; his music is a blend of Afrobeats and hip-hop. He derived his stage name from Jamaican singer Bob Marley, whom he admires; his dreadlocks are also a tribute to the singer.

2019–present: Musical releases, Marlian Records and debut album

Naira Marley released the Zlatan-assisted track "Am I A Yahoo Boy" on 3 May 2019, and was arrested by the Economic and Financial Crimes Commission (EFCC) that same day. He released "Soapy" on  27 June 2019, a few days after he was released from prison. On 11 January 2020, he won Viewers' Choice for "Soapy" at the 2020 Soundcity MVP Awards.

On 18 December 2019, Naira Marley released his second EP Lord of Lamba which was a mixture of Afrobeats and hip-hop. The EP comprises 6 tracks and features guest artists such as CBlvck, Young John and Mayorkun. Its production was handled by Killertunes, Rexxie and Studio Magic.

During the "Marlian Fest", which was held at the Eko Hotels and Suites on 30 December 2019, Naira Marley announced the launch of his record label Marlian Records and unveiled CBlvck, Zinoleesky and Fabian Blu as signed acts. On 10 July 2020, Naira Marley took to his Instagram Page to unveil another act under his label, named: Emo Grae with a new single and visual titled 0903 featuring Buju.

On 21 June 2021, the renowned and award-winning musician announced in a post he made on his verified Instagram handle that he will be dropping a new album. According to him, the album is tagged 'God's Timing Is The Best' and he will be releasing it after releasing the official video for his 'COMING' track.

Controversies

EFCC arrest 
On 10 May 2019, the EFCC arrested Naira Marley and his friends Zlatan, Tiamiu Kayode, Adewunmi Adeyanju Moses, Micheal "Taqueesh" Adenuga and Abubakar Musa. The arrest was made a day after Marley released the video for the controversial single "Am I A Yahoo Boy". Five days later, the EFCC released Zlatan and three others but kept Marley in custody due to the evidence against him. On 16 May 2019, the EFCC charged him with 11 counts of fraud before a Federal High Court in Ikoyi, Lagos. On 19 May 2019, Zlatan released the single "4 Nights In Ekohtiebo" while Marley was still in prison. In it, he talks about his industry friends, foes and other people who he admired and how they came through for him. In May 2019, Marley was arraigned before the Federal High Court and pleaded not guilty; a bail hearing was set for 30 May 2019. On the day of the bail hearing, Marley released "Why", a song that was accompanied by an image of him in handcuffs. On 14 June 2019, he was released from jail 14 days after being granted ₦2,000,000 bail. A few days later, he released "Soapy", a track about the sexual habits of inmates in detention.

In October 2019, Marley returned to court to face the charges. His case was later adjourned to 27 February 2020 after an EFCC witness testified against him.

Flouting lockdown order 
Naira Marley was detained by the Nigerian Police Force for contravening the lockdown order imposed on Lagos State by President Muhammadu Buhari to contain the spread of coronavirus in the country. On 13 June 2020, he performed at a concert in Abuja despite the interstate travel ban and social distancing rules aimed at curbing the spread of COVID-19. He was arraigned by the FCT Administration before a mobile court in Abuja over the concert.

Valentine's Concert In Cameroon
On Saturday 13 February 2021, a report surfaced online that the highly anticipated Valentine's Concert by Marley in Cameroon had been canceled by government authorities in the country. The concert had already been postponed twice by the organizer and moved to different venues but was later cancelled entirely by authorities in the country due to jealousy on the part of Cameroonian entertainers who are displeased with the traction Nigerian music and musicians have in Cameroon.

Domestic Violence Allegation / Assault 
On 05 October 2022, in a series of statements on his social media, singer Naira Marley was accused of assaulting his signee Mohbad. The posts featured pictures and videos of rapper Mohbad with noticeable injuries. which necessitated hospitalization. But reacting to the allegation, Naira Marley, though, responded to the accusation by calling the incident a "family affair. "The singer claimed that Mohbad was likely "high" (drunk) when making the complaint as a response to the situation in an Instagram live video.

Discography

Albums
God's Timing's the Best (2022)

EPs 
Gotta Dance (2015)
Lord of Lamba (2019)

Singles

Awards and nominations

References

External links

1991 births
21st-century Nigerian male singers
21st-century British male singers
Living people
Yoruba musicians
Nigerian male rappers
British male rappers
Black British male rappers
English male rappers
People from Lagos State
People from London
People from Peckham
Yoruba-language singers
English-language singers from Nigeria